U.S. Route 40 (US 40) is a U.S. highway running from Silver Summit, Utah east to Atlantic City, New Jersey. The easternmost segment of the route runs  through the southern part of New Jersey between the Delaware Memorial Bridge over the Delaware River in Pennsville Township, Salem County, where it continues into Delaware along with Interstate 295 (I-295), east to Atlantic Avenue and Pacific Avenue in Atlantic City, Atlantic County. The route passes through Salem, Gloucester, and Atlantic counties as well as the boroughs of Woodstown, Elmer, Newfield, and Buena.  The route encounters a mix of rural, suburban, and urban environs throughout its journey across South Jersey.

In 1923, pre-1927 Route 18S was to run from Penns Grove to Atlantic City along much of present-day US 40 in New Jersey. US 40 was signed along Route 18S in 1926, running from a ferry in Penns Grove that crossed the Delaware River to Wilmington, Delaware. In 1927, Route 18S was renumbered to Route 48. The portion of US 40 in Atlantic City was legislated as Route 55 in 1938, around the same time the route was moved to a ferry across the Delaware River between Pennsville and New Castle, Delaware. After the Delaware Memorial Bridge and the New Jersey Turnpike were both completed in 1951, US 40 was moved to its current alignment in the area. In 1953, the Route 48 and Route 55 designations along US 40 were removed. A toll freeway was once planned along the US 40 corridor in the 1980s to alleviate traffic, but it was never built after it was deemed the traffic volume was not high enough for it to be constructed.

Route description

Salem County
US 40 enters New Jersey along with I-295 from Delaware on the Delaware Memorial Bridge over the Delaware River. The road heads southeast into  Salem County as an eight-lane freeway maintained by the Delaware River and Bay Authority that passes through industrial areas.  I-295/US 40 interchanges with the southern terminus of US 130 and the western terminus of Route 49, where  I-295 splits from US 40 by turning northeast on a freeway that soon overlaps  CR 551 briefly while US 40 follows the four-lane New Jersey Turnpike and continues east on it for a short distance, entering Carneys Point Township. US 40 splits from the New Jersey Turnpike at the last exit before the toll barrier, the same point where Route 140 heads west and CR 540 heads to the east. From this point, US 40 becomes an at-grade, four-lane divided highway maintained by the New Jersey Department of Transportation called Wiley Road that runs a short distance south of the New Jersey Turnpike, containing a wide median. It continues into rural areas consisting of woods, farms, and residences, heading farther to the south of the New Jersey Turnpike.

Upon meeting the eastern terminus of Route 48, US 40 turns to the southeast and becomes the Harding Highway, a two-lane undivided road that passes through more agricultural areas. Upon crossing CR 646, the road enters Pilesgrove Township and continues past the Cowtown Rodeo. The route passes through the residential community of Sharptown before coming to an intersection with Route 45. At this point, US 40 turns to the northeast to run concurrent on Route 45 and enters Woodstown, where it becomes West Avenue and passes residences before reaching the downtown area. Here, Route 45 splits from US 40 by heading north on Main Street and US 40 continues to the east as East Avenue. The route passes through more developed areas, crossing the SMS Rail Lines' Salem Branch line and heading north of Woodstown High School. The route crosses from Woodstown into Pilesgrove Township again, where it turns east-southeast as Harding Highway and heads back into a mix of fields and woods amid homes. About  after entering Upper Pittsgrove Township, the road crosses CR 581. In the community of Pole Tavern further to the east, US 40 encounters Route 77, CR 604, and CR 635 at the Pole Tavern Circle. Past Pole Tavern, the road passes more farm fields before coming to Elmer, where it becomes Chestnut Street. In Elmer, the route passes homes and makes a turn to the northeast onto Front Street. Upon leaving Elmer, US 40 becomes Harding Highway again and forms the border of Upper Pittsgrove Township to the north and Pittsgrove Township to the south, passing through forested areas among development. The route crosses CR 553 before passing through the community of Porchtown.

Gloucester and Atlantic counties
After Porchtown, US 40 crosses into Franklin Township in Gloucester County,  turning southeast and running through more woods. It comes to a cloverleaf interchange with Route 55, where US 40 is briefly a four-lane divided highway. Past Route 55, the route continues past Malaga Lake and comes to the community of Malaga. In Malaga, the route heads into a business district and intersects Route 47, turning to the northeast to run concurrent on a three-lane road with a center left-turn lane through inhabited areas.  After passing over Conrail Shared Assets Operations' (CSAO) Vineland Secondary railroad line, US 40 and Route 47 split. Route 47 heads north and US 40 turns south and continues parallel to the railroad tracks. The road makes a turn to the east-southeast, leaving Malaga and returning to areas of farmland and trees. The road briefly runs along the northern border of Newfield before coming to a crossroads with CR 555. After passing near the Vineland-Downstown Airport, US 40 intersects CR 557 and forms a concurrency with that route.

Immediately after CR 557 joins US 40, the road enters Buena, Atlantic County and continues southeast into inhabited areas. After running through the commercial center of town, where it crosses the Southern Railroad of New Jersey's Southern Running Track line, the road comes to the southern terminus of Route 54 and the eastern end of CR 619 in a business area located on the outskirts. At this point, it enters Buena Vista Township, and CR 557 splits form US 40 by heading to the southeast on Buena-Tuckahoe Road. From this point, US 40 becomes concurrent with CR 557 Truck and enters dense woodland containing homes and businesses as well as occasional farms. The road reaches the residential community of Richland, where it encounters the eastern terminus of CR 540 and CR 622 and crosses the Beesleys Point Secondary railroad line operated by the Cape May Seashore Lines railroad. Upon leaving Richland, the route crosses into Hamilton Township, where it runs through Mizpah before heading back into forested areas and a few residential sectors. US 40 intersects the eastern terminus of CR 552, briefly becoming a divided highway before turning east into denser inhabited areas. The highway intersects CR 559 Truck/CR 606, at which point it becomes concurrent with CR 559 Truck. The route meets Route 50, where CR 557 Truck splits to the south. Route 50 joins US 40 before the road crosses the Great Egg Harbor River. Upon crossing the river, the road enters Mays Landing and turns north into the downtown area. CR 559 Truck splits southbound to follow CR 617 to the east. A short distance later, the road meets CR 559 and US 40 splits from Route 50 by turning east onto that route. This intersection marks the beginning of CR 559 Truck northbound. The road passes more development before CR 559 splits from the road by heading southeast. US 40 heads east out of Mays Landing, where it continues through woodland and increasing residential development. The road widens into four lanes as it comes to US 322 (Black Horse Pike) near the Hamilton Mall. At this point, US 40 forms a concurrency with US 322, which lasts for the remainder of the route.

The two routes continue to the southeast through business areas, meeting CR 575 and a ramp to the Atlantic City Expressway. CR 575 turns east to follow US 40/US 322. The road enters Egg Harbor Township, and CR 575 splits from US 40/US 322 by turning to the south. The route passes more wooded residential and commercial areas, as well as the Storybook Land amusement park, before intersecting CR 563. US 40/US 322 forms a concurrency with that route and passes through a business district that includes the Harbor Square shopping center. CR 563 splits from the road by continuing southeast and the Black Horse Pike heads east interchange with the Garden State Parkway. The only direct ramp present is between the Black Horse Pike westbound and the Garden State Parkway northbound; all other movements are provided by CR 563. Past here, US 40/US 322 continues east past more businesses, crossing CR 651 before entering Pleasantville. In Pleasantville, the road crosses US 9. Past this intersection, the roadway passes under the Somers Point Bike Path. Upon crossing CR 585, the Black Horse Pike continues past residences as an undivided road, crossing back into Egg Harbor Township. The road passes more businesses, closely paralleling the Atlantic City Expressway before entering Atlantic City. Here, the name becomes Albany Avenue and it comes to a pair of ramps that provide access to and from the Black Horse Pike eastbound and the Atlantic City Expressway westbound. US 40/US 322 enters marshland, crossing the Great Thorofare onto Great Island, where it has an interchange providing access to Atlantic City High School that also has U-turn ramps, before passing over the Beach Thorofare. Past this bridge, the road passes between businesses to the west and the closed Bader Field airport and Surf Stadium to the east. US 40/US 322 crosses the Inside Thorofare on a drawbridge and continues as a county maintained road to its end at Atlantic Avenue and Pacific Avenue, one block from the boardwalk. Through New Jersey, US 40 serves as a main road connecting Atlantic City with points south along Interstate 95, such as Baltimore and Washington, D.C.

History
The portion of US 40 that overlaps US 322 follows the Black Horse Pike, a turnpike established in 1855 that was to run from Camden to Atlantic City via Blackwoodtown. In 1902, the Atlantic County Board of Freeholders authorized the construction of a toll-free highway from Pleasantville to Albany Avenue in Atlantic City, which was completed in 1905. The entire route of modern US 40 was signed as the Powder Way, running from the ferry at Penn's Grove to Atlantic City.

In 1923, pre-1927 Route 18S was created along the current alignment of US 40 east of the Route 48 intersection, running from Penns Grove to Atlantic City. When the U.S. Highway System was established in 1926, the alignment of US 40 in New Jersey ran from Penns Grove, where a ferry carried the route across the Delaware River to Wilmington, Delaware, east to Atlantic City along pre-1927 Route 18S. In the 1927 New Jersey state highway renumbering that occurred a year later, pre-1927 Route 18S was replaced by Route 48. In 1936, US 322 was also signed concurrent with US 40 on the Black Horse Pike. The portion of US 40/US 322 that existed in Atlantic City was legislated as Route 55 in 1938. Also by 1938, US 40 was moved to a ferry that ran across the Delaware River between Pennsville and New Castle, Delaware, following current Route 49, local roads, and CR 551 to travel between the ferry and Route 48. Following the completion of the Delaware Memorial Bridge and the New Jersey Turnpike in 1951, US 40 was moved to the new bridge and routed to follow a small portion of the New Jersey Turnpike and Wiley Road to the current eastern terminus of Route 48. In the 1953 New Jersey state highway renumbering, which eliminated concurrencies between U.S. highways and state routes, Route 48 was removed from the portion of US 40 east of its current eastern terminus and the Route 55 designation was dropped entirely.

In the 1980s, Congressman William J. Hughes proposed a freeway along the US 40 corridor in order to alleviate increased traffic along that route following the legalization of gambling in Atlantic City. This freeway, which was to be maintained by the New Jersey Expressway Authority, was to run from the Delaware Memorial Bridge east to Atlantic City. The NJDOT determined that the traffic volume on US 40 did not justify the construction of a freeway along the corridor. The Cardiff Circle along US 40/US 322 at CR 563 and CR 608 in Egg Harbor Township was eliminated in a $3.7 million project completed in 2002.

In 2013, the road was one of three that tied for the #1 ranking on the Tri-State Transportation Campaign's list of the top ten most dangerous roads for pedestrians in New Jersey, New York and Connecticut. The route, along with US 130 (Burlington Pike) in Burlington County and US 1 in Middlesex County, were so ranked due to the nine pedestrian deaths that occurred on each of those roads from 2009 to 2011.

The $27.5 million project is scheduled to begin in 2022 and completed in 2025.

Major intersections

See also

References

External links

New Jersey Roads - US 40
Speed Limits for State Roads - Route 40

 New Jersey
40
Transportation in Atlantic County, New Jersey
Transportation in Gloucester County, New Jersey
Transportation in Salem County, New Jersey